The thornback ray (Raja clavata), or thornback skate, is a species of ray fish in the family Rajidae.

Distribution
The Thornback ray is found in the Atlantic coastal waters of Europe and western Africa. It is also present from south Africa to the southwestern Indian Ocean  and in the Mediterranean and Black Seas. It is native possibly as far south as Namibia and South Africa.

Its natural habitats are open large seas and shallow seas. It is sometimes seen trapped in large estuarine pools at low tide.

The thornback ray is probably one of the most common rays encountered by divers.

Habitat 
The thornback ray is usually found on sedimentary seabeds such as mud, sand or gravel at depths between 10-60m. Juvenile fish feed on small crustaceans, particularly amphipods and bottom-living shrimps; adults feed on crabs, shrimps and small fish.

Description 
Like all rays, the thornback ray has a flattened body with broad, wing-like pectoral fins. The body is kite-shaped with a long, thorny tail. The back is covered in numerous thorny spines, as is the underside in older females.

This ray can weigh from 4.5 to 8.75 lb (2 to 4 kg).

Their colours vary from light brown to grey with darker blotches and numerous small darker spots and yellow patches. Sometimes the yellow patches are surrounded by small dark spots. The underside is creamy-white with a greyish margin. When threatened they can appear black.

In sexually mature fish, some of the spines are thickened with button-like bases (known as bucklers). These are particularly well developed on the tails and backs of sexually mature females.

Taxonomy
Raja clavata, the thornback ray (or thornback skate, roker), was named by Carl Linnaeus in the 10th edition of Systema Naturae in 1758, in the genus Raja of the Order Rajiformes in the Family Rajidae.

It is one of about 13 species of skate (family Rajidae) that are known from the North Sea and adjacent Atlantic waters.

Common names

Common names include:
 Danish — Sømrokke.  
 Dutch — Stekelrog.  
 English — Roker / Thornback ray / Dorn. 
 Estonian — Astelrai. 
 Faeroese — Naglaskøta.
 Finnish — Okarausku. 
 French — Raie bouclée. 
 German — Nagelrochen.
 Icelandic — Dröfnuskata.
 Latvian — Dzelkņraja.
 Norwegian — Piggskate.
 Polish — Raja nabijana a. ciernista.
 Portuguese — Raia lenga / Raia brocheada
 Russian — Колючий скат.	
 Spanish — Raya de clavos.
 Swedish — Knaggrocka.

 Morphometrics 
Dorsal spines : 0; Anal spines: 0; Anal soft rays: 0.  ; disc-width 1,25 to 1,36 times in its length, its length 1,70 to 1,83 times in total length; pectoral fins with clear angles on lateral side; triangular pelvic fins  . Dorsally prickly; large females also prickly throughout their ventral surface; young and large males prickly along the borders of their discs and the underside of their snout. 30-50 thorns form a median row from the nape to the first dorsal fin; additional large 'buckler' thorns with swollen bases scattered on upper surface of disc in adults .  
Max length : 105 cm male/unsexed; 139.0 cm (female); common length : 85.0 cm ; max. weight: 18.0 kg.

 Life cycle 
Oviparous. Polyandrous species. Paired eggs are laid and deposited on shallow sand, mud, pebble or gravel bottoms . Up to 170 egg cases can be laid by a single female in a year, average fecundity around 48-74 eggs. In northwestern Europe, egg cases are laid during spring, and in the Mediterranean during winter and spring. Egg cases are oblong capsules with stiff pointed horns at the corners, each containing one embryo. Capsules are 5.0-9.0 cm long without the horns and 3.4-6.8 cm wide. Egg cases are anchored with an adhesive film.

Embryos feed solely on yolk. Egg cases hatch after about 4–5 months and pups are about 11–13 cm.

Mating season is from February to September, peaking in June. Adults observed to form same-sex aggregations during the mating season with females moving to shallower inshore waters approximately a month before the males. Mating does not occur in the Baltic Sea. This is one of the fish used by the marine leech Pontobdella muricata as a host.

British Isles population

A search about the growth and maturation of Raja clavata in the Solway Firth (part of the border between Cumbria, England and Dumfries and Galloway, Scotland)  shows that the males and females appear to mature at 42 and 45 cm in disc width respectively. The Solway population is heavily exploited by an unrestricted commercial fishery and a considerable proportion (48.6%) of the retained catch is immature. It is suggested that fishing pressure has brought about a reduction in the size at which female fish mature.

See also
 
 

References

 Picton, B.E. & Morrow, C.C., 2005. — Encyclopedia of Marine Life of Britain and Ireland''.
 Habitas.org.uk:  Raja clavata (Thornback ray)

External links
 
Fishbase.org Database: Raja clavata
 IUCN Red List of all current Threatened Species
 

thornback ray
Fish of the East Atlantic
Fish of the Mediterranean Sea
Fish of the North Sea
Near threatened biota of Africa
Near threatened biota of Europe
thornback ray
thornback ray
Taxonomy articles created by Polbot